Star Wars: Return of the Jedi (The Original Motion Picture Soundtrack) is the film score to the 1983 film Return of the Jedi, composed and conducted by John Williams and performed by the London Symphony Orchestra. The score was recorded at the Abbey Road Studios in January and February 1983. Again, John Williams served as producer. Herbert W. Spencer, Thomas Newman and Gordon Langford served as orchestrators. Engineer Eric Tomlinson, music editor Kenneth Wannberg, and record supervisor Lionel Newman again reprised their respective duties. The score earned another Academy Award nomination for Williams. Return of the Jedi, which is the original trilogy's shortest score, was only released on a single-LP instead of a double-set like the Star Wars and The Empire Strikes Back soundtracks before it.

The 1983 original version was remastered by Sony Classical and released on LP in 2015. A remastered version of the soundtrack was released by Walt Disney Records on May 4, 2018. This remaster was newly assembled from the highest-quality tapes available, rather than sourced from the existing 1983 album masters.

Original 1983 release

Track listing
LP vinyl released by RSO; compact disc released by Polydor

Total Time: 44:59

This track listing is also shared with the 2015 vinyl release by Sony Classical and the 2018 release by Walt Disney Records.

Charts

Subsequent releases

Release history

Star Wars Trilogy: The Original Soundtrack Anthology

In 1993, 20th Century Fox Film Scores released a four-CD box set containing music from the original Star Wars trilogy. This release marked the first time that the complete contents of the original double-LP releases of the scores from the first two films became available on CD. Disc three in the set was devoted to Return of the Jedi, with further tracks on disc four.

"20th Century Fox Fanfare with CinemaScope Extension" - 0:23
"Main Title/Approaching the Death Star" - 5:22
"Han Solo Returns (At the Court of Jabba the Hutt)" - 4:08
"Fight in the Dungeon" - 3:41
"The Return of the Jedi" - 5:02
"The Emperor Arrives" - 2:07
"The Death of Yoda" - 6:05
"Parade of the Ewoks" - 3:27
"Luke and Leia" - 4:47
"The Emperor Confronts Luke" - 3:29
"Into the Trap" - 2:39
"First Ewok Battle/Fight With the Fighters" - 7:24
"The Forest Battle" - 4:04
"The Final Duel/Into the Death Star" - 3:40
"The Emperor's Death" - 2:44
"Darth Vader's Death" - 2:33
"Through the Flames" - 1:39
"Leia Breaks the News/Funeral Pyre for a Jedi" - 2:22
"Ewok Celebration/Finale" - 7:58

Bonus Tracks (disc four of the same set)

"Heroic Ewok/The Fleet Goes Into Hyperspace"
"The Ewok Battle"
"Lapti Nek"
"Faking the Code"
"Brother and Sister"
"Leia is Wounded/Luke and Vader Duel"
"The Return of the Jedi (Alternate)"
"Leia Breaks the News (Alternate)/Funeral Pyre for a Jedi (Film Version)"
"Ewok Celebration (Film Version) /End Credits (Film Version)"
 The second part of track twenty-one, "End Credits (Film Version)," is from The Empire Strikes Back.

1997 Special Edition

In commemoration for the franchise's 20th anniversary in 1997, RCA Victor released 2-disc limited edition soundtracks for each film in the original trilogy. The release got a title The Star Wars Trilogy: Special Edition. For Return of the Jedi only, two newly recorded music tracks were added at George Lucas's request. John Williams wrote and recorded a new ending melody with the London Symphony Orchestra titled "Victory Celebration", replacing "Ewok Celebration" from the original release. Jerry Hey composed and arranged "Jedi Rocks" as a replacement for "Lapti Nek". 

Sony Classical Records re-issued the soundtrack on September 21, 2004 under the title Star Wars Episode VI: Return of the Jedi (Original Motion Picture Soundtrack). The 2-disc set was advertised as the complete score despite missing several musical cues and original tracks.

Although released as the complete score, there are several cues not on the Special Edition that have been released on previous releases. These include:

"Lapti Nek" (Album) – This is released on the anthology set and is replaced on the SE with "Jedi Rocks".
"Leia's News" (Alternate) – This is released on the anthology set. The film version however is heard on the SE.
"Ewok Celebration" (Ewok Source) – This is released on the anthology set but is replaced on the SE with the new celebration music written for the SE.
"Ewok Celebration" (Choir Source) – This is released on the anthology set and is an alternate vocal mix (using only the choir, not the Ewok voices).

Unreleased cues
Currently, several source cues and other material are unavailable. Many of these master tapes could not be located in time for the score's Special Edition release and are presumed lost. These tracks include:

 "Jabba the Hutt's Concert Suite" - All but the final portion of this original recording, incorrectly edited onto the end of the cue "Han Solo Returns" on the Anthology, remains unreleased. (This same portion is heard on the Return of the Jedi DVD menu as well).
 Film Version of "Lapti Nek" (Original Source) - Several versions of this source cue written by John Williams' son Joseph are available. Currently available are the album version on the Anthology and an extended album version and an instrumental track released on an LP single. However, the film version has yet to be released.
 English Version of "Lapti Nek" (Sung by Joseph Williams) - This cue can be heard partially in From Star Wars to Jedi: The Making of a Saga, but remains either lost or simply unreleased. Williams later released a version of the song as "Urth", with him singing both Huttese and English lyrics—as well as parts of the "Ewok Celebration", which he also wrote.
 "Max Rebo Band Song (Sail Barge Dance)"—Source Cue - This piece, performed by the resident musicians in Jabba's court (The Max Rebo Band) has never been released. It is heard after Chewbacca is taken away and also on Jabba's sail barge (hence its title). This cue can also be heard almost totally complete in From Star Wars to Jedi: The Making of a Saga, but remains unreleased.
 Unknown Source Cue - this cue is not used in the film but is credited to Joseph Williams. Nothing more is known.
 Alternate Film Takes - Several cues such as "Superstructure Chase" are presented on the SE using incorrect and often flubbed takes.
 "Battle for Endor Insert" - This insert can be heard in the film when Chewbacca and the Ewoks use the AT-ST to blow up another AT-ST and is similar to a section from "The Forest Battle Concert Suite" but has never been released.
 "Ewok Celebration" (Film Version) - Two versions of this cue have been released, however, neither preserves the actual original recording used in the film.

Recording Information

Cue list

1m3 Approaching the Death Star
1m3x (New Bar 23)
1m4 Vader Contacts Luke
1m5 The Iron Door
1m6-2m1 To Jabba's Throne
2m2 Jabba Source No. 1
2m3 My Favorite Decoration
2m5 Jabba's Prisoners
3m2 The Big Thaw
3m2xI 
3m2xII
3m3 A Strange Visitor (Possibly)
3m4-4m1 Fight In the Dungeon
3m4x
4m1a The Sentence (Possibly)
4m3 The Sarlacc Pit
4m4 Jabba's End (Revised)
4m5 The Emperor
4m5x
4m5xII
5m1-6m1 Yoda's Scene
5m1-6m2 pt. II Luke and Ben
6m2 Battle Plans
6m3 Faking the Code
6m3x
6m4 Jungle Encounter
7m1 After the Bike Chase
7m2 Enter the Ewok
7m3-8m1 More Trouble (Possibly)
8m2 More Ewoks Appear
8m4 Using the Force
8m5 Bedtime Stories
9m2 Brother and Sister
9m3 Son Meets Father
9m4 Finding An Entrance
9m5 To Hyper Space
9m6-10m1 Heroic Ewok
10m2 The Emperor Confronts Luke
10m3 Into the Trap
10m3 Rebel Forces Captured
10m5-11m1 First Ewok Battle
10m5-11m1x
11m2 Fight With Tie Fighters
11m3 The Ewoks Retreat (Possibly)
11m4 The Emperor Provokes Luke
11m5 The Ewok Battle
11m5x
11m6-12m1 Leia is Wounded
12m2 The Battle Rages
12m3 More Duel
12m4 The Explosion
12m5 The Emperor's Death
13m1 Space Battle
13m2 Vader's Death
13m3 Through the Flames
13m4 New
13m4 Leia Breaks the News
13m5a End Credits
Freedom 
End Credits 
Brother and Sister
Jabba the Hutt
Parade of the Ewoks 
The Battle in the Woods
New Finale [Special Edition]

References

Star Wars film soundtracks
John Williams soundtracks
Soundtrack
1983 soundtrack albums
1980s film soundtrack albums
RSO Records soundtracks
Sony Classical Records soundtracks
London Symphony Orchestra soundtracks
Walt Disney Records soundtracks